Tarik Ali Mishlawi, known by his stage name Mishlawi, is an American hip-hop performing artist, who grew up in Portugal. Dubbed as "Portuguese Hip Hop's revelation" by La Vanguardia,
 and commonly referred to as a "TransAtlantic talent",
 Mishlawi started his musical career on YouTube, before he was discovered by Richie Campbell and subsequently signed to Bridgetown Records, and later by Universal music and Island records.

Mishlawi has become a popular performing artist at many of Portugal's prominent music festivals, including the world famous MEO Sudoeste festival.

Personal life
Tarik Ali Mishlawi was born in the United States, but moved to Cascais, Portugal, on the Portuguese Riviera. He attended the Carlucci American International School of Lisbon until graduating high school, after which he attended American University, in Washington, DC, for two years, before attending the Point Blank Music School in London.

Discography

Mixtapes
 Wiz Kid - 2014

Singles
 "All Night" - 2016
 "Always on My Mind" - 2016
 "Limbo" - 2016
 "Time" - featuring Zara G; 2016
 "Boohoo" - featuring Richie Campbell; 2016
 "Turn Back" - 2017
 "What's Happening" - produced by Zander, King Fuh; 2017
 "Ignore" - 2017
 "Afterthought" - featuring Trace Nova; 2017
 "FMR" - 2018
 "Homies & Pythons" - 2018
 "Rain" - with Richie Campbell and Plutónio; 2018
 "Bad Intentions" - 2018
 "Uber Driver" - 2019
 "Audemars" - featuring Nasty C; 2019
 "Hotel" - feat gson (prod. davwave); 2020
 "Break It" - prod. davwave; 2020
 "Growing Pains" - 2020

Albums
 Mishlawi EP - 2018
 Solitaire - 2019

References

External links
Official site

1996 births
Living people
American hip hop singers
American male songwriters
21st-century Portuguese male singers
Portuguese songwriters
People from Cascais
Portuguese hip hop musicians
21st-century American male singers
21st-century American singers
Portuguese people of Arab descent
English-language singers from Portugal